The Nalgonda railway station (station code:NLDA), is the major railway station in Nalgonda district of Telangana state.

History 
A 152 km long Nadikudi-Pagidipalli section foundation stone laid by then Prime Minister Indira Gandhi on 7 April 1974. The Nadikudi-Pagidipalli section was opened for traffic in three phases on 1987, November 1988, April 1989. During this time Nalgonda railway station was opened. This line was completed by Indian Railways.

Station amenities 
It is one of the stations in the division to be equipped with Automatic Ticket Vending Machines (ATVM's).

New lines 
A new railway line from Vishnupuram to Janpahad–Mellacheruvu–Motumarri was completed in 2019, it joined the Kazipet–Vijayawada main line.

References 

Railway stations opened in 1989
Railway stations in Nalgonda district
Railway stations in Guntur railway division